Hanna Airport, a small local airfield, is located  southeast of Hanna, Alberta, Canada.

References

External links
Page about this airport  on COPA's Places to Fly airport directory

Registered aerodromes in Alberta